Anthony Riddington (22 December 1911 – 25 February 1998) was an English cricketer who played first-class cricket for Leicestershire from 1931 to 1950. He was born and died in Countesthorpe, Leicestershire.

References

1911 births
1998 deaths
English cricketers
Leicestershire cricketers
People from Countesthorpe
Cricketers from Leicestershire